A Turkish bath is an English term used both for the hammam, the traditional steam baths of Islamic culture, and the Banya (sauna) of Russia.

Turkish Bath may also refer to:

 Victorian Turkish bath, a variant of the ancient Roman baths re-introduced to the British Empire, the USA, and Germany in the 19th century 
 Turkish bath, a type of brothel, often referred to as a Bagnio
Turkish bath, a term sometimes used as the English translation for Thai Ab Ob Nuat bath and massage services
Turkish bath, in the past, a term used in Japan for what are now called soaplands, brothels offering bath and massage services
Darghouth Turkish Bath, a Turkish bath in Tripoli, Libya
 Steam: The Turkish Bath (1997), or Hamam, a film
 The Turkish Bath (1862), a painting by Jean-Auguste-Dominique Ingres

See also 
 Hamam (disambiguation)